Daniel Charles Key (born 2 November 1977) is an English former footballer who played as a midfielder in the Football League for Darlington, spent time on loan with League of Ireland club Waterford United, and played non-league football for a variety of clubs in the north-east of England.

Life and career
Key was born in Darlington, County Durham, and began his football career as a youth trainee with his hometown club, Darlington F.C. He made his Football League debut on 15 October 1996, as a late substitute in a 2–0 defeat away to Cardiff City in the Third Division. He appeared twice more in the Third Division, each time as a late substitute in a defeat, and once in the 1996–97 FA Cup, starting the match against non-league club Runcorn which Darlington won 4–1. He spent time on loan with League of Ireland club Waterford United in early 1997, and finished the season with Gateshead, for whom he played eight games in the Conference.

He went on to play non-league football for Crook Town, Spennymoor United, Whitby Town, Shildon,whom he captained to the first round proper of the 2003–04 FA Cup, in which they faced Notts County,West Auckland Town, and Darlington Railway Athletic.

Key was a member of the Coundon Conservative Club team that won the 2007 FA Sunday Cup.

References

1977 births
Living people
Footballers from Darlington
English footballers
Association football midfielders
Darlington F.C. players
Waterford F.C. players
Gateshead F.C. players
Spennymoor Town F.C. players
Crook Town A.F.C. players
Whitby Town F.C. players
Shildon A.F.C. players
Darlington Railway Athletic F.C. players
West Auckland Town F.C. players
English Football League players
National League (English football) players
Northern Football League players
Northern Premier League players